Pennsylvania Route 872 (PA 872) is a  state highway located in Cameron and Potter counties in Pennsylvania.  The southern terminus is at PA 120 in Grove Township.  The northern terminus is at U.S. Route 6 (US 6)/PA 44 in Coudersport.

Route description

PA 872 begins at an intersection with PA 120 in Grove Township, Cameron County, heading north-northeast on two-lane undivided First Fork Road. The road heads through forested areas, running along the west bank of the First Fork Sinnemahoning Creek. The route runs between tracts of the Elk State Forest, curving to the northeast. PA 872 winds to the north and passes along the western edge of Sinnemahoning State Park, passing near the George B. Stevenson Reservoir. The road continues north-northwest past the state park through forested areas with sparse homes, passing through Lushbaugh and First Fork before turning to the north-northeast.

PA 872 enters Wharton Township in Potter County and becomes an unnamed road, continuing through forested areas to the west of Sinnemahoning State Park and passing through Berge Run. The road runs between tracts of the Susquehannock State Forest and leaves the state park as it winds to the northeast, crossing the First Fork Sinnemahoning Creek and passing through Wharton. The route continues north-northwest through more forests with some fields, running to the east of the creek and heading into Sylvania Township. Here, PA 872 comes to the community of Costello and turns west onto Costello Road, crossing the First Fork Sinnemahoning Creek into Portage Township. The road turns northwest into more rural areas and continues into the borough of Austin, where it becomes Costello Avenue and passes a few homes. The route turns to the north and comes to an intersection with the southern terminus of PA 607, becoming Rugaber Street and running through more residential areas. 

PA 872 heads into forests and enters Keating Township, becoming an unnamed road. The road heads through more forested areas with a few fields and homes, turning to the east and crossing into Homer Township. Here, the route becomes Dividing Ridge Road and turns northeast through more rural areas. PA 872 heads into more agricultural areas with some residences and woods, continuing into Eulalia Township. Here, the road becomes unnamed, turning north in the community of Jenkins Hill and running through wooded areas with a few fields and homes. PA 872 heads into the borough of Coudersport and becomes Buffalo Street, passing a few homes and businesses before ending at US 6/PA 44. Past this intersection, the road continues as North Hollow Road, which is an unsigned quadrant route designated State Route 4013.

Major intersections

See also

References

External links 

Pennsylvania Highways: PA 872

872
Transportation in Cameron County, Pennsylvania
Transportation in Potter County, Pennsylvania